Journal of Clinical Gastroenterology is a peer reviewed medical journal covering gastroenterology and hepatology, published by Lippincott Williams & Wilkins. It was established in 1979 and the current editor-in-chief is Ronnie Fass, MD (Case Western Reserve University School of Medicine).

Abstracting and indexing 
The journal is abstracted and indexed in:
 Science Citation Index 
 Current Contents/Clinical Medicine
 Index Medicus/MEDLINE/PubMed
According to the Journal Citation Reports, the journal has a 2013 impact factor of 3.186.

References

External links 
 

Gastroenterology and hepatology journals
Lippincott Williams & Wilkins academic journals
English-language journals
Publications established in 1979